The Government of Shadow (Hukumat al-zill : riwayah) is an Arabic novel written by Saudi novel writer Mundhir al-Qabbani (also known as Munther Kabbani) and published in 2007. The book was praised by many critics for its groundbreaking style in Arabic literature which was dubbed as the first Arabic intellectual thriller.

The author, Mundhir al-Qabbani has been nicknamed by readers as "the Dan Brown" of the Arab world.

References

External links
Author website 
 

2007 novels
Saudi Arabian novels
Thriller novels
Arabic-language novels